CJLO is the official campus and community radio station for Concordia University in Montreal, Quebec and is operated almost entirely by its volunteer membership. The station broadcasts from the Loyola campus, and it can be heard at 1690 AM in Montreal, iTunes radio in the College/University category, the CJLO mobile app, or on the CJLO website.

CJLO started streaming online 7 days a week in early 2003, and the station began broadcasting by radio in the Montreal area on 1690 AM with 1000 watts of power in late 2008. The tower and transmitter are located in Lachine and the signal can be heard as far as Ottawa and Burlington, Vermont, United States.

CJLO was voted #1 Best Radio Station in Montreal in the Cult MTL Best of MTL Readers Poll 2022.

History
The station was originally formed in 1998 from the merger of CRSG, a closed circuit station at Concordia's Sir George Williams Campus, and CFLI, a carrier current station at the Loyola Campus. It continued to broadcast by closed circuit until 2003, when it launched an Internet radio stream.

The station was granted a license by the Canadian Radio-television and Telecommunications Commission in 2006 to broadcast on the AM band at 1690, and began airing a testing signal in September 2008.

The station officially launched its on-air programming on October 15, 2008 with the song "Left of the Dial" by The Replacements.

On April 25, 2014, the CRTC published CJLO's application for a low-power FM retransmitter on 107.9 MHz, to alleviate reception issues downtown. The main concern with the use of 107.9 is potential interference from WVPS, the Vermont Public Radio flagship in Burlington. The application was denied by the CRTC on January 26, 2015, as they felt that there were no broadcasting deficiencies of the 1690 AM signal within its immediate broadcast area. WVPS, whose signal is not protected outside the United States, was not considered a factor in this decision.

Programs
CJLO has over 70 original live programs with formats that include spoken-word and a variety of musical genres such as rock alternative, classical, hip-hop, jazz, experimental, metal, world beat, and more.

As of Winter 2016, the station currently airs the following:

Aloof Future, hosted by Chubby
Ashes to Ashes, hosted by Alex
Anatomy of Caribbean Music, hosted by Gordon "Gee" Weekes
At the Movies, hosted by Remi Caron-Liss
Audio Penpals, hosted by DJ Littleforest and Friendz
Autobeat, hosted by MNJIVR
Beat the World, hosted by Kelly "Sugarface Nene" and Neil "Mr Lalla"
Beats from the East, hosted by DJ Mister Vee
Behind the Counter, hosted by Rebekah G. and Sonja H.
Beyond The Black Rainbow, hosted by OCDJ.
Beyond That Graveyard III, hosted by the K-Man
Brave New Jams, hosted by Clifton Hanger
Burnt Offerings, hosted by DJ Spacepirate
BVST, hosted by Angelica
Caribbean Callaloo, hosted by Raphael McKenzie (DJ 610), Pete Douglas, and Gordon "Gee" Weekes
Champions of the Local Scene, hosted by the CJLO Volunteers
Charts & Crafts, hosted by Dennis A. and Joana C.
Cinema Smackdown, hosted by Tessipedia and Max
Colours that can't be seen, hosted by Ozzdog
Computer Sourire, hosted by Danilo
Cornice Crow, hosted by Genaro PC
Creators Chorus, hosted by Annick MF, Jess Glavina, and Teeana Munro
Democracy Now, hosted by Amy Goodman
Diggin' in the Crates, hosted by Lazy the selector and DJ Sleazy P
Dirty Work, hosted by Denis A.
Don't mess this up, Jacob, hosted by Jacob Greco
Fatal Attraction, hosted by Patricia Petit Liang
Floydian Slip, hosted by Craig Bailey
Fukubukuro, hosted by DJ Lawrell
Gospel Unlimited, hosted by Ray Johnston with research/talk facilitator Curtis, and produced by Tynesha
Grade A Explosives, hosted by Andrew Wixq
Hiway 1, hosted by Fredy Iuni
Hooked on Sonics, hosted by Omar Sonics
Into the Coven, hosted by Patrick McDowall
In the Club, hosted by N. Gattuso
Impossible Music, hosted by Gachary
Je Suis TBA, hosted by Joana C.
Jonny & Cupcakes, hosted by Sam Obrand and Jon Levine
Local Everything, hosted by MC Jonny B
Main Event Radio, hosted by Ryan Rider
More Fyah, hosted by Junior Vibes and Singing P
My Private HE.B.G.B.S, hosted by the K-Man
Necromantik, hosted by DJ Necrotik and DJ Dreadkitten
New Media and Politics 2.0, hosted by Karl Knox
Nozin' Around', hosted by Emeline VidalPhantastiq Cypha, hosted by Brian Döc HolidæPsychic City, hosted by Abby S.Radio Fun, hosted by Idle MattRex's Barn Sessions, hosted by Rex Elroy CliffSewer Spewer, hosted by Chris the frogSomething for the radio, hosted by D Shade and Redd DreddSlax Trax, hosted by Zakary SlaxShibuya Crossing, hosted by Saturn De Los Angeles a.k.a. SATYYY.Sublime State of Doom, hosted by SeanThe Belldog, hosted by LucyThe Commonwealth Conundrum, hosted by Rebecca Munroe and Danny PayneThe F Hole, hosted by Erica BridgemanThe Go-Go Radio Magic Show, hosted by Oncle Ian and Prince PaluThe Groove Master's Hour, hosted by Pete DouglasThe Limelight, hosted by DJ Lady Oracle and J-NiceThe Live Wire Show, hosted by Pete DouglasThe Machine Stops, hosted by DJ ThinkboxThe Noisy Loft, hosted by Orin LoftThe Sound You Need, hosted by DJ JenevaThe Starting Rotation, hosted by Julian McKenzie, Robert Arzenshek, Giordano Cescutti, Daniele Iannarone, Justin Ferrara, and Matthew ShanahanThe Trend, hosted by Camille and Krystal ChristineThe Vibe Room, hosted by MEL P a.k.a. DJ LilmangoTurn on the darkness, hosted by PhilliamVibe$tation, hosted by MylestoneWorld Beat News, hosted by Gordon "Gee" WeekesWaves of Honey, hosted by HoneydripYeti Dreams and Stranger Things, hosted by Stephanie Dee

Some of CJLO's programs that aired in the past several years include:Best of the West, hosted by Sarah StuparChante Lakay, hosted by SchillerCountdown to Armageddon, hosted by Brian HastieCurrently Concordia, hosted by Melissa Mulligan and Nikita SmithDeath Metal Disco Show, hosted by Emaciate BeatsDigital Coffee, hosted by DJ Soykaff a.k.a. KNIGHTExit Hour, hosted by Daniel DixonGeek Soda, hosted by DJ Soykaff a.k.a. KNIGHTGlitch, Please, hosted by your best friend John JacobGoing Down Under, hosted by Tim ForsterGreedy Graffiti, hosted by DJ MisschiefHayti Plus, hosted by Jean D.Haze World, hosted by Stephen K.Killer Baby Tomatoes, hosted by Colin HarrisFairest Dwellings, hosted by Alex MasséFear of Music, hosted by Marshall V.Feel Good Hit of the Summer, hosted by C.W. MacGregorFunk Shui, hosted by Marina Minh Nguyen and Patricia Petit LiangLet the Rhythm Hit Em, hosted by RemissionMidnight Love Affair, hosted by Mason WindelsMorning Jazz Hour, hosted by Karl KnoxMaiden Voyage, Hosted by Beansie SaretskyOnomatopoeia Show, hosted by Robin FPits & Poisoned Apples, hosted by Serge Del GrossoPurple Carrot, hosted by Anna C.Revolution 33 1/3, hosted by Mack MackenzieSalvation from Sin, hosted by DJ Michael Terzian a.k.a. SinisterStroll Around the Groove, hosted by Julien B. and MouradStation to Station, hosted by Ethan VesTake 5, hosted by Connor McComb, a.k.a. DJ C-DADDYThe Anglo-Franco Tango, hosted by Floraine BonnevilleThe Hypnotic, hosted by YanissaThe Kids Are So-So, hosted by DJ So-SoThe Link Radio, hosted by The Link, Concordia's independent newspaperThe Reaktor, hosted by Abby SchachterThe Sports Grind, hosted by Gerry Brossard Jr. and Grant RobinsonThe Midnight Caper, hosted by Kyle FitzsimmonsThe New Noise, hosted by RuntThe Game Misconduct, hosted by Google Guy, Phil, and MaggThe Wake-Up Call, hosted by Carlo S.Twee Time, hosted by Stephanie PastelWith Gay Abandon', hosted by Julie, a.k.a. OCDJ

Awards and honours
CJLO is a station that has received multiple nominations and wins at the CMJ Music Marathon College Radio Awards since 2008. The station was consistently voted as one of the top-ten Best Radio Stations in The Montreal Mirror's Best of Montreal Readers Poll.

CMJ College Radio Awards

Montreal Mirror Best of Montreal Readers Poll

Other
In 2010, CJLO was ranked as one of the best college radio stations by the Huffington Post and was the only Canadian radio station selected to attend the First Annual International Radio Festival in Zurich, Switzerland. In 2013, CJLO was voted the second Best Radio Station in the CultMTL Best of MTL Readers Poll. In 2022, CJLO was voted #1 Best Radio Station in Montreal in the CultMTL'' Best of MTL Readers Poll.

References

External links 
 
 
 

Jlo
Jlo
Concordia University
Internet radio stations in Canada
Jlo
Radio stations established in 1998
1998 establishments in Quebec